The Utah Division of Wildlife Resources is part of the Utah Department of Natural Resources for the state of Utah in the United States. The mission of the Division of Wildlife Resources is to serve the people of Utah as trustee and guardian of the state's wildlife. In addition to managing and protecting Utah's wildlife, UDWR manages hunting and fishing opportunities within the state.

Regions and operations
The division operates five regions headquartered in Ogden (Northern Region), Vernal (Northeastern Region), Springville (Central Region), Price (Southeastern Region), and Cedar City (Southern Region). The division operates two hunter safety centers Salt Lake City (Lee Kay Shooting Center) and in Logan (Cache Valley Shooting Range). The division is also responsible for Hardware Ranch near Hyrum, The Eccles Wildlife Education Center in Farmington, the Fisheries Experiment Station in Logan, and the Great Basin Research Center in Ephraim.

Fish Hatcheries
The division maintains eleven production hatcheries, a research facility and a warmwater hatchery to stock Utah's streams, rivers, lakes and reservoirs with sportfish. Hatcheries are located throughout the state.
 J. Perry Egan Hatchery
 Fisheries Experiment Station
 Fountain Green Hatchery
 Glenwood Hatchery
 Kamas Hatchery
 Lee Kay Fish Hatchery
 Loa Hatchery
 Mammoth Creek Hatchery
 Mantua Hatchery
 Midway Hatchery
 Springville Hatchery
 Wahweap Warmwater Hatchery
 Whiterocks Hatchery

Events

November 2020: Found the monolith in Utah

References

Wildlife
Wildlife
State wildlife and natural resource agencies of the United States